Oenone (minor planet designation: 215 Oenone) is a typical main belt asteroid. It was discovered by the Russian astronomer Viktor Knorre on April 7, 1880, in Germany, and was the second of his four asteroid discoveries. The asteroid is named after Oenone, a nymph in Greek mythology.

The orbital plane is inclined by 1.7° to the plane of the ecliptic. The cross-section diameter is 36 km. It is classified as an S-type asteroid in the Tholen taxonomy, suggesting a silicaceous (stony) composition.

A search of quasi-complanar asteroids has shown that 215 Oenone and 1851 ≡ 1950 VA can approach to within  of each other, one of the closest known potential proximities of astronomical bodies.

References

External links
The Asteroid Orbital Elements Database
Minor Planet Discovery Circumstances
 
 

Background asteroids
Oenone
Oenone
S-type asteroids (Tholen)
18800407